Michigan's 8th congressional district is a United States congressional district in Central Michigan. The district was first created in 1873, after redistricting following the 1870 census. From 2003 to 2013, it consisted of all of Clinton, Ingham, and Livingston counties, and included the southern portion of Shiawassee and the northern portion of Oakland counties. From 2013 to 2023, the district no longer covered Clinton or Shiawassee counties and instead covered more of Oakland County, including Rochester. In 2023, the district was redrawn to be centered on the city of Flint, and includes all of Saginaw and Bay counties, almost all of Genesee County, and portions of Midland and Tuscola counties.

The district's current representative is Democrat incumbent Dan Kildee, who defeated Republican Paul Junge in November 2022, and previously represented the old 5th district. After the 2022 redistricting, by the Cook Partisan Voting index, this is the median district in the country with 217 districts rated more Democrat and 217 districts rated more Republican.

Major cities
Flint
Saginaw
Bay City
Midland

Recent election results in statewide races

History
Prior to 1992, the 8th congressional district included the cities of Saginaw and Bay City as well as Huron, Tuscola and Sanilac Counties in the Thumb of Michigan, Arenac county north from Bay County, a total of about half the area of Saginaw County, and small northern portions of Lapeer and St. Clair counties.

This area would largely be transferred to the 5th district after the 1990 census, while most of the old 6th district became the 8th district.  Unlike the old 6th district, the 8th did not include Pontiac.  To make up for the loss in population, it was pushed further into Lansing (which had previously been split between the 6th and 8th districts), picking up all of Ingham County. It also added the area around Brighton and portions of Washtenaw and Genesee counties.

In the 2002 redistricting, the district gained all of Clinton County about half of Shiawasee County and most of its area in Oakland County while losing its shares of Washtenaw and Genesee counties.

In the 2012 redistricting, the district dropped all of its area in Clinton and Shiawasee counties and was pushed further into Oakland County.

In the 2022 redistricting, the district was shifted to mid-Michigan to include the Tri Cities and Flint.

List of members representing the district

Recent election results

2012

2014

2016

2018

2020

2022

Historical district boundaries

See also
Michigan's congressional districts
List of United States congressional districts

Notes

References
 Govtrack.us for the 8th District - Lists current Senators and representative, and map showing district outline
 The Political graveyard: U.S. Representatives from Michigan, 1807-2003
 U.S. Representatives 1837-2003, Michigan Manual 2003-2004

 Congressional Biographical Directory of the United States 1774–present

08
Constituencies established in 1873
1873 establishments in Michigan